Fulnek is a town in Nový Jičín District in the Moravian-Silesian Region of the Czech Republic. It has about 5,500 inhabitants. The historic town centre is well preserved and is protected by law as an urban monument zone.

Administrative parts
Villages of Děrné, Dolejší Kunčice, Jerlochovice, Jestřabí, Jílovec, Kostelec, Lukavec, Pohořílky, Stachovice and Vlkovice are administrative parts of Fulnek.

Geography

Fulnek is located in the hilly landscape of the Nízký Jeseník mountain range. The town lies at the confluence of two streams, Husí and Gručovka.

History

Fulnek was probably founded by the lords of Lichtenburk, who received this land from King Ottokar II of Bohemia. The first written mention of Fulnek is from 1293, when the town already had a fortress, a church and a rectory. The town was probably planned as the centre of a larger estate, which is indicated by the relatively large town square. Fulnek was inhabited by German population, during the Hussite Wars became partly Czech.

In the 16th century, Fulnek was a prosperous Renaissance town with German majority. It became an important centre of Moravian Church. A very important representative of this church was John Amos Comenius, who lived and worked here in 1618–1621.

In the first half of the 17th century, when Fulnek was owned by the Bruntálský of Vrbno family, there was a lively construction activity in the early Baroque style, which significantly enriched the town and gave it a new character. At the end of the 18th and the beginning of the 19th century, Fulnek developed rapidly thanks to cloth and weaving production.

Until 1918, Fulnek was part of the Austrian monarchy (Austria side after the compromise of 1867), in the Neutitschein – Nový Jičín District, one of the 34 Bezirkshauptmannschaften in Moravia. Before World War I, Fulnek became an important base for the radically oriented Nazi Party. After the establishment of the Czechoslovak Republic, the town leadership joined a strong German national movement, which demanded the secession of our border. In the second half of the 1920s, ethnic differences in the town subsided.

In 1938, Fulnek was occupied by the Nazi Germany as part of the Reichsgau Sudetenland. Until the spring of 1945, it became the main control centre for Germanization resettlement operations throughout the border, which was occupied by Germany. The great fire at the end of the war severely damaged the historic centre, but did not damage the town's landmarks. The German-speaking population was expelled in 1945 according to the Beneš decrees and replaced by Czech settlers.

Transport

Fulnek lies on a short railway line of local importance Fulnek–Suchdol nad Odrou.

Sport
The local football club Fotbal Fulnek plays in lower amateur tiers.

Sights

The complex of the Fulnek Castle is formed by two buildings called Horní Castle and Dolní Castle ("upper" and "lower" castle). The old Gothic castle, first documented in 1372, was rebuilt in to a Renaissance residence in the 1560s–1570s, now called Horní ("upper") Castle. In 1628–1633 the third floor was added and a prismatic tower was built. In 1653–1655, the fortification was modernized and the castle was baroque modified. Another building, now called Dolní ("lower") Castle, was built in the mid-18th century and then adapted to the flats and offices of lords' officials. Today the castle complex is privately owned and inaccessible to the public.

The parish Church of the Holy Trinity was built in 1750–1760 and is one of the most important Baroque monuments in the region.

A Capuchin monastery was founded here in 1668. The complex of baroque buildings dates from the 1670s, the Church of Saint Joseph was built in 1674-1683. The monastery was abolished in 1950 and the complex fell into disrepair. The church was reconstructed in 2006 and is used for cultural and social purposes.

Knurr's Palace dates from the early 18th century. It was built for the local burgher E. Knurr. Today it houses the Memorial of J. A. Comenius with an exposition on his life in Fulnek, and a library.

Notable people
John Amos Comenius (1592–1670), philosopher and pedagogue; lived and worked here in 1618–21
Johann Joseph Thalherr (1730–1807), Austrian architect
Johann Leopold Hay (1735–1794), Bishop of Hradec Králové
Leopold Ritter von Dittel (1815–1898), Austrian urologist
August Gödrich (1859–1942), German racing cyclist
Franz Konwitschny (1901–1962), German conductor and violist
Karolína Huvarová (born 1986), fitness trainer and model; lives here
Petra Kvitová (born 1990), tennis player; raised here

Twin towns – sister cities

Fulnek is twinned with:
 Châtel-sur-Moselle, France
 Łaziska Górne, Poland
 Ljutomer, Slovenia
 Sučany, Slovakia
 Téglás, Hungary
 Vrútky, Slovakia

See also
Fulneck Moravian Settlement and Fulneck Moravian Church, Yorkshire, England

References

External links

Tourist Information Centre

Cities and towns in the Czech Republic
Settlements of the Moravian Church